Oris Leon Hockett (September 29, 1909 – March 23, 1969) was an outfielder in Major League Baseball who played for the Brooklyn Dodgers (1938–39), Cleveland Indians (1941–44) and Chicago White Sox (1945). Hockett batted left-handed and threw right-handed. He was born in Amboy, Indiana.

In a seven-season career, Hockett was a .276 hitter with 13 home runs and 214 RBI in 551 games played.

Hockett died in Torrance, California, at age 59.

Highlights
American League All-Star team (1944)
Finished 17th in American League MVP Award vote (1943)

External links

Baseball Library

American League All-Stars
Brooklyn Dodgers players
Chicago White Sox players
Cleveland Indians players
Major League Baseball outfielders
1909 births
1969 deaths
Major League Baseball center fielders
Major League Baseball right fielders
Baseball players from Indiana
Norfolk Elks players
Sioux Falls Canaries players
Dayton Ducks players
Milwaukee Brewers (minor league) players
Nashville Vols players